The Akao Dam is a gravity dam on the Shō River in Nishiakao village about  south of Nanto in Toyama Prefecture, Japan. It was constructed between 1974 and 1978. The dam has an associated 34 MW hydroelectric power station which was commissioned in 1978. Of the nine dams on the Shō River it is the fifth furthest downstream.

See also

Ohara Dam – downstream
Narude Dam – upstream

References

Dams in Toyama Prefecture
Gravity dams
Dams completed in 1978
Dams on the Shō River
Hydroelectric power stations in Japan
Nanto, Toyama